Ryszard Komornicki (born 14 August 1959) is a former Polish footballer who played as a winger or an attacking midfielder. He is currently the sporting director of GKS Tychy.

Playing career
Born in Ścinawa, Lower Silesia, Komornicki played for GKS Tychy and Górnik Zabrze in his country, winning four Ekstraklasa championships in a row with the latter club, then moved to Switzerland at the age of 30 where he represented FC Aarau, FC Wohlen and FC Kickers Luzern. He acted as player-coach to the last two teams, retiring at nearly 42. While at FC Aarau he was part of the side that won the Swiss national title in 1992–93.

Komornicki won 20 caps for the Poland national team in almost four years and was a participant at the 1986 FIFA World Cup, appearing in all three group stage matches (one win, one loss and one draw). He made his debut on 31 October 1984, featuring 20 minutes in a 2–2 friendly draw against Albania in Mielec.

Managerial career
Komornicki took up coaching in 1998, going on to be in charge of a host of Swiss clubs for more than 15 years (including Aarau and Wohlen). Interspersed with this, he had two spells with Górnik and worked with El Gouna FC of the Egyptian Premier League in the 2011–12 season.

On 10 July 2019, Komornicki was appointed as the sporting director of GKS Tychy.

References

External links

1959 births
Living people
People from Lubin County
Sportspeople from Lower Silesian Voivodeship
Polish footballers
Association football midfielders
Ekstraklasa players
I liga players
GKS Tychy players
Górnik Zabrze players
Swiss Super League players
FC Aarau players
FC Wohlen players
Poland international footballers
1986 FIFA World Cup players
Polish expatriate footballers
Expatriate footballers in Switzerland
Polish expatriate sportspeople in Switzerland
Polish expatriate sportspeople in Egypt
Polish football managers
FC Wohlen managers
FC Luzern managers
FC Baden managers
FC Aarau managers
FC Wil managers
FC Chiasso managers
Górnik Zabrze managers
Polish expatriate football managers
Expatriate football managers in Switzerland
Expatriate football managers in Egypt